Maccaffertium is a genus of flatheaded mayflies in the family Heptageniidae. There are at least 20 described species in Maccaffertium.

Species
These 20 species belong to the genus Maccaffertium:

 Maccaffertium appaloosa McCafferty, 2011
 Maccaffertium bednariki (McCafferty, 1981)
 Maccaffertium carlsoni (Lewis, 1974)
 Maccaffertium exiguum (Traver, 1933)
 Maccaffertium flaveolum (Pictet, 1843)
 Maccaffertium ithaca (Clemens & Leonard, 1924)
 Maccaffertium lenati (McCafferty, 1990)
 Maccaffertium luteum (Clemens, 1913)
 Maccaffertium mediopunctatum (McDunnough, 1926)
 Maccaffertium meririvulanum (Carle & Lewis, 1978)
 Maccaffertium mexicanum (Ulmer, 1920)
 Maccaffertium modestum (Banks, 1910)
 Maccaffertium pudicum (Hagen, 1861)
 Maccaffertium pulchellum (Walsh, 1862)
 Maccaffertium sinclairi (Lewis, 1979)
 Maccaffertium smithae (Traver, 1937)
 Maccaffertium terminatum (Walsh, 1862)
 Maccaffertium vicarium (Walker, 1853)
 Maccaffertium wudigeum McCafferty & Lenat, 2010
 † Maccaffertium annae Macadam & Ross, 2016

References

Further reading

External links

 

Mayflies
Articles created by Qbugbot